Letong (Carina) Hong (born June 8, 2001) is a Chinese mathematician and Rhodes scholar at the University of Oxford working in number theory and combinatorics.

Education

For ten years she trained in contest-style problem-solving at her province's Olympiad math team. Prior to enrolling at MIT, she participated in the Ross Mathematics Program and Stanford University Mathematics Camp.

Hong received dual bachelor's degrees in math and physics from MIT in three years, Sigma Pi Sigma, and conducted research at the Budapest Semesters in Mathematics, and Research Experiences for Undergraduates programs at the University of Minnesota Duluth and University of Virginia.

Research

As an undergraduate, Hong solved conjectures from experts and proven important results in combinatorics, number theory, and probability. By the end of her junior year in college, she had written nine research papers, all of which have been published or accepted in journals such as Proceedings of the American Mathematical Society, Combinatorial Theory, Advances in Applied Mathematics, Research in Number Theory, and the Ramanujan Journal. These papers cover a wide range of areas in number theory, including L-functions of modular elliptic curves and K3 surfaces, moonshine theory, congruences of theta and partition functions; while in combinatorics, areas covered include Markov chains on edge colorings of bipartite graphs, combinatorics on words, pattern avoidance in inversion sequences, and stack-sorting algorithms.

While at MIT, in addition to her research, Hong was President of the Undergraduate Math Association, President of the International Students Association, and in executive roles with the First-Generation and/or Low-Income student coalition and the Society of Physics Students. In 2022, she gave a TED talk at MIT CSAIL, introducing group theory to the general public in Boston and Cambridge area.

Recognition

Her contributions in mathematical research were recognized by the 2023 Morgan Prize and the 2022 Schafer Prize. These two prizes are the most prestigious awards for research by an undergraduate. According to the citations, Hong's research addressed open questions posed by top mathematicians in their respective fields.

In 2022 Hong also won the Stanford Maryam Mirzakhani Fellowship, Princeton Centennial Fellowship, Harvard James Peirce Fellowship, and Berkeley Fellowship. Hong is a 2021 Rhodes scholar.

References

External links

 Personal homepage
 arXiv author listing

2001 births
Living people
21st-century Chinese mathematicians
21st-century women mathematicians
Massachusetts Institute of Technology alumni
Alumni of the University of Oxford
Chinese Rhodes Scholars
Number theorists
Combinatorialists